The flag of Ontario is the provincial flag of Ontario, Canada. It is a defaced Red Ensign, with the Royal Union Flag in the canton and the Ontario shield of arms in the fly. The flag of Ontario was derived from the Canadian Red Ensign, which was used as a civil ensign and as a de facto flag of Canada from the late 19th century to 1965. It was adopted in a period when many Canadian provinces adopted their own flags. May 21 is Ontario Flag Day.

Description

The flag of Ontario is a defaced Red Ensign. The flag is an adaptation of the Canadian Red Ensign, which had been the de facto national flag of Canada from 1867 to 1965. The flag is a red field with the Royal Union Flag in the canton and the Ontario shield of arms in the fly. The coat of arms of Ontario had been previously granted by Royal Warrant of Queen Victoria in 1868. It features a green field with three gold maple leaves and above it, a white band with a red St. George's cross.

The specifications of the flag are 1:2. The shade of red in the flag is specified as "British Admiralty Colour Code No. T1144 for nylon worsted bunting and No. T818A for other bunting." The shield of the coat of arms is "centred in the half farthest from the staff".

History

Before 1965, the Canadian Red Ensign had served as the de facto national flag of Canada. It was flown at all military installations in Canada and overseas, embassies and consulates, outside the legislature and government buildings, at Royal Canadian Legion halls, and many private homes.

In 1964, the federal government, after a long and acrimonious debate, adopted the Maple Leaf flag as the flag of Canada. This decision was unpopular among some Canadians. These included many Ontarians, particularly in rural areas that made up much of the political base of Premier John Robarts' Ontario Progressive Conservatives. Robarts, after coming up with the idea with his adviser, Richard Rohmer, proposed that Ontario would have its own flag and that it would be a Red Ensign like the previous Canadian flag. It was traditional for jurisdictions around the world with a British system of government and way of life to adapt either a blue or red ensign as a flag, by adding a provincial coat of arms or similar symbol. It was originally intended to place the full Ontario coat of arms on the flag, but this was later reduced to only the shield. Robarts felt the Ensign was an important symbol that reflected Ontario's heritage and the sacrifices made by Canadian troops under the Red Ensign. Premier Robarts stated "without conflict with the flag of Canada there is an honored place within our provincial boundaries for a provincial flag for Ontario. Here, in our province, there is a rich heritage of tradition and historic background which we do well to recognize".

Canadians were exhausted by the long debate over the national flag and leaders of both the Ontario Liberal Party and the Ontario New Democratic Party supported the design for the proposed Ontario flag. The only opposition came from Sudbury Liberal Member of Provincial Parliament Elmer Sopha who was fervently opposed to the flag, arguing that it failed to reflect Ontario's diverse character and that it was "a flag of revenge" against the new national flag. However, he was joined by only one other MPP, Liberal Leo Troy, in voting against the flag, and it was passed by the Legislative Assembly on March 17. It went in effect on May 21, 1965. The flag of Manitoba was adopted under similar circumstances.

On May 13, 2015, the Liberal MPP from Etobicoke Centre Yvan Baker put forward the Ontario Flag Day Act, 2015. This bill, which passed the house and received royal assent on June 4 in the same year, declares May 21 every year as Ontario Flag Day.

Reception 
The Toronto Daily Star supported the adoption of the flag stating "the Red Ensign was quite properly rejected as a flag for Canada because it was not an acceptable symbol of the nation as a whole. But it is much more suitable as a flag for Ontario".  A 2001, a survey conducted by the North American Vexillological Association (NAVA) placed the Ontario provincial flag 43rd in design quality out of the 72 Canadian provincial, U.S. state, and U.S. territory flags ranked. The design of any flag, however, is entirely subjective and not easily compared. Graham Bartram, chief vexillologist at the Flag Institute, noted “There's often a fundamental misunderstanding of flags by politicians. Saying you like a flag because of its design is like saying you like your family because they are all handsome or beautiful. You love them because of who they are, unconditionally. Flags are a bit like that."  This remark was made after a 2016 New Zealand flag referendum, in which New Zealanders voted to retain their existing flag, inclusive of the Union Jack.

The incorporation of traditional or historical symbols is often an important element in flag design. Bruce Patterson notes the continued significance of the Red Ensign within the context of Canadian flag design, “while not disparaging the current National Flag...the Red Ensign is worth considering as a part of our history, and after fifty years an acknowledgement of this is certainly not a threat to the position of the National Flag.”

Redesign proposals
Some Commonwealth countries with the Union Jack in the canton have debated redesigning their national flags, such as in the case of the 2015–2016 New Zealand flag referendums. There has been comparatively less debate around re-designing the Ontario flag, although some commentators have made calls to change the flag. The justification is mainly around perceptions that the current flag centres colonialism and Old Stock Canadians. In the United States, although Mississippi recently redesigned its flag, there is no debate on replacing the flag of Hawaii, the only state possessing a Union Jack in its state flag. Most recently, in July 2021, University of Western Ontario Professor Mano Majumdar launched a petition to redesign the flag, stating that "the best flags are distinct and inclusive. Ontario’s is neither" and calling for "the Ontario legislature to replace the provincial flag with a more distinct and inclusive flag, chosen by democratic means."

The petition also spurred support for the flag with one editorial encouraging pride in the flag as it was “a symbol of success.” It was emblematic of the origin of Ontario’s most successful institutions of British inheritance: parliamentary democracy, law and freedom. The editorial argued, using the flags of Fiji or Tuvalu as an example, that the Union Jack is not exclusive to any ethnic group and represents Ontarians of all backgrounds. It further suggested that the Union Jack could also symbolise the attaining of freedom for an estimated 30-40,000 escaped slaves reaching British North America on the Underground Railroad.

Other flags of Ontario

See also
 List of Canadian flags

Notes

References

External links

Ontario Flag Act
Government of Ontario, About Ontario: Emblems and Symbols
Flags of Canada - Ontario book chapter by Alistair B. Fraser
Rebellion of 1837–1839 in Upper Canada flags of Upper Canada from Flags of the World
Flag of Ontario in the online Public Register of Arms, Flags and Badges

Flags of Ontario
1965 establishments in Ontario
Provincial symbols of Ontario
Ontario
Ontario
Ontario